Boris 'Biba' Nayfeld (Russian: Борис 'Биба' Найфельд, Belarusian: Барыс 'Біба' Нейфелд; born 1947 in Gomel) is a former Belarusian/Russian mob boss and heroin trafficker, who operated out of Brighton Beach, New York City.

Arrival in America and rise to power 
Boris Nayfeld arrived in the United States in the late 1970s as a Soviet Jewish refugee under the Jackson-Vanik Amendment. He became a small-time criminal and was arrested in Nassau County for grand larceny, pleaded guilty to petty larceny and was placed on probation. He later became a bodyguard and chauffeur to Brighton Beach mob boss Evsei Agron. According to the NYPD, Nayfeld remains the prime suspect in the 1983 murder of Moldovan writer turned gangster Yuri Brokhin.

After Agron's murder in 1985, Nayfeld became an enforcer for Ukrainian mob boss Marat Balagula who ruled the neighborhood rackets before being convicted of gasoline bootlegging in 1991. In the aftermath, Nayfeld took over the remnants of Balagula's organization and began to branch out on his own.

Heroin ring 
Together with Italo–Polish gangster Ricardo Fanchini, Nayfeld ran a successful heroin-smuggling operation that transported China White from Thailand to the United States. After being smuggled into Singapore, the drug was hidden in television picture tubes and shipped to Poland via a Belgium-based import-export company. From there, couriers flew it via plane to Brighton Beach. Upon arrival the heroin was sold partly to the Five Families and partly to Latino street gangs. Things were going well for Nayfeld and he spent his time in either a luxury apartment in Antwerp with his mistress and his family home on Staten Island opposite a nature reserve.

Gangland war and arrest 
In January 1994 he was arrested by federal agents for drug trafficking. Later, he and his co-defendants, the Dozortsev brothers, pleaded guilty to laundering the drug money which belonged to themselves and Ricardo Fanchini.

References

Jewish American gangsters
American drug traffickers
American crime bosses
Russian crime bosses
People from Gomel
American people of Belarusian-Jewish descent
Year of birth missing (living people)
Living people
21st-century American Jews